Grassy Fork Township is one of twelve townships in Jackson County, Indiana, United States. As of the 2010 census, its population was 668 and it contained 288 housing units. It was named from the Grassy Fork Creek.

Geography
The streams of Grassy Fork, Knob Creek and Pond Creek run through this township.

Unincorporated towns
 Tampico

Adjacent townships
 Washington Township (northeast)
 Vernon Township (east)
 Gibson Township, Washington County (south)
 Monroe Township, Washington County (southwest)
 Driftwood Township (west)
 Brownstown Township (northwest)

Cemeteries
The township contains eleven cemeteries: Blair, Lubker, Mount Pleasant, Pioneer, Riechers/Niermans, Rucker, Russell Chapel, Stunkel, Sturgeon, Tuell, and Waskom.

Major highways
  Indiana State Road 39

Education
Grassy Fork Township residents may obtain a free library card from the Brownstown Public Library in Brownstown.

References
 
 United States Census Bureau cartographic boundary files

External links
 Indiana Township Association
 United Township Association of Indiana

Townships in Jackson County, Indiana
Townships in Indiana